DWIM (89.5 FM), broadcasting as 89.5 Star FM, is a radio station owned and operated by Bombo Radyo Philippines through its licensee People's Broadcasting Service, Inc. Its studios and transmitter are located at Bombo Radyo Broadcast Center, 87 Lourdes Subdivision Rd., Baguio.

History
The station was established on August 21, 1991, as 89.5 WIM. It aired a Top 40 format with the slogan "The Rhythm of the City". In less than a year, WIM was ranked by the Radio Research Council as the most listened station in the city. On April 22, 1994, to provide a more solid identity for all of Bombo Radyo's FM stations, WIM was re-launched as 89.5 Star FM and switched to a mass-based format. On February 3, 2014, Bombo Network News began simulcasting in several Star FM stations. In the 1st quarter of 2016, to emphasize more on the music, Star FM started carrying the slogan "It's All For You".

References

Radio stations in Baguio
Bombo Radyo Philippines
Radio stations established in 1991